"Nixon's Enemies List" is the informal name of what started as a list of President of the United States Richard Nixon's major political opponents compiled by Charles Colson, written by George T. Bell (assistant to Colson, special counsel to the White House), and sent in memorandum form to John Dean on September 9, 1971. The list was part of a campaign officially known as "Opponents List" and "Political Enemies Project".

The list became public knowledge on June 27, 1973, when Dean mentioned during hearings with the Senate Watergate Committee that a list existed containing those whom the president did not like. Journalist Daniel Schorr, who happened to be on the list, managed to obtain a copy of it later that day.

A longer second list was made public by Dean on December 20, 1973, during a hearing with the Congressional Joint Committee on Internal Revenue Taxation.

Purpose

The official purpose, as described by the White House Counsel's Office, was to "screw" Nixon's political enemies, by means of tax audits from the Internal Revenue Service, and by manipulating "grant availability, federal contracts, litigation, prosecution, etc." In a memorandum from John Dean to Lawrence Higby (August 16, 1971), Dean explained the purpose of the list:

The IRS commissioner, Donald C. Alexander, refused to launch audits of the people on the list.

People listed
The twenty names in the memo were as follows, although a master list of Nixon's political opponents with additional names was developed later.

Arnold Picker, film executive
Alexander E. Barkan, head of the AFL-CIO's Committee on Political Education
Edwin Guthman, journalist
Maxwell Dane, advertising executive
Charles Dyson, businessman
Howard Stein, financier
Rep. Allard Lowenstein (D-NY), congressman
Morton Halperin, foreign policy expert
Leonard Woodcock, president of the United Auto Workers
S. Sterling Munro Jr., aide of former Washington Senator Henry M. Jackson
Bernard T. Feld, professor
Sidney Davidoff, lawyer
Rep. John Conyers (D-MI), congressman
Samuel M. Lambert, executive secretary of the National Education Association
Stewart Rawlings Mott, philanthropist
Rep. Ron Dellums (D-CA), congressman
Daniel Schorr, journalist
S. Harrison Dogole, president of Globe Security Systems
Paul Newman, actor
Mary McGrory, journalist

 Halperin and Davidoff were the only two individuals from the original list still living.

Master list of political opponents

According to Dean, Colson later compiled hundreds of names on a "master list" which changed constantly. On December 20, 1973, the Congressional Joint Committee on Internal Revenue Taxation concluded that people on the "Enemies" list had not been subjected to an unusual number of tax audits. The report revealed a second list of about 576 (with some duplicates) supporters and staffers of George McGovern's 1972 presidential campaign given to Internal Revenue Commissioner Johnnie Walters by John Dean on September 11, 1972.  The Washington Post printed the entire list the next day, but The New York Times reported just a few paragraphs on page 21.

Reception 
Newsman Daniel Schorr and actor Paul Newman stated, separately, that inclusion on the list was their greatest accomplishment. When this list was released, Schorr read it live on television, not realizing that he was on the list until he came to his own name.  Author  Hunter S. Thompson remarked he was disappointed he was not on it.

In popular culture
In the United States, the term "enemies list" has come to be used in contexts not associated with Richard Nixon. For example, satirist P. J. O'Rourke's 1989 "A Call for a New McCarthyism" in The American Spectator has a hybrid blacklist and enemies list, suggesting that, contrary to the spirits of these lists, the subjects there should be overexposed, not suppressed, "so that a surfeited public rebels in disgust."

In Philip Roth's Our Gang, which was published in 1971, two years before the list was first mentioned in public, the Nixon parody character Trick E. Dixon begins to compile a rudimentary list of five political enemies. It includes Jane Fonda and the Black Panthers who were on the real-life expanded master list, The Berrigans (who were not) and Curt Flood.

In "Homer's Enemy" (1997), an 8th-season episode of The Simpsons, Moe Szyslak shows off his own enemies list, which Barney Gumble quickly appraises as Nixon's list, with the latter's name crossed out and replaced with Moe's. Moe promptly adds Barney to the list for his insolence. A later episode made likely reference to the list when Homer falls from a shoddy chair that breaks, then remarks that the chair's manufacturer "just made the list!".

In Futuramas first episode, "Space Pilot 3000" (1999),  Fry and Bender walk through a room of live preserved heads of famous people. When Fry knocks over Nixon's jar, Nixon says "That's it, you just made my list!"

In a BoJack Horseman second season episode called "The Shot" (2015), the title character and Todd visit the Nixon Presidential Library with the intent of stealing a scaled-down replica of the library. Mounted on the walls are Nixon's Enemy and "Frenemy" Lists. Walt Disney is included on the Enemy List.

See also
 Disposition Matrix
 IRS targeting controversy

References

External links 

Records of the Watergate Special Prosecution Force 1971 to 1977 via National Archives and Records Administration
EnemiesList.info, a complete, searchable, annotated Nixon's Enemies List
Statement of Information, Hearings Before the Committee on the Judiciary, House of Representatives, Ninety-Third Congress, Second Session, Pursuant to H. Res. 803, a Resolution Authorizing and Directing the Committee on the Judiciary to Investigate Whether Sufficient Grounds Exist for the House of Representatives to Exercise its Constitutional Power to Impeach Richard M. Nixon, President of the United States of America, Book VIII, Internal Revenue Service, May-June 1974 via the Internet Archive

 
Watergate scandal
Lists of American people
Political terminology of the United States